Robert J. Lunn (born April 24, 1945) is an American professional golfer who played on the PGA Tour in the 1960s and 1970s.

Lunn was born in San Francisco, California. He was the 1963 U.S. Amateur Public Links champion. He turned pro in 1965 and won six times on the PGA Tour. In 1968, he was named Most Improved Golfer of the Year by Golf Digest. He earned $102,711 and finished 11th on the money list that year after winning two tournaments in a row – the Memphis Open Invitational and the Atlanta Classic. Lunn's best years in professional golf were 1968–72 when he appeared in the top 60 on the money list in each of those years.

Lunn never won a major, but won the par-3 contest at Augusta National's pitch & putt course during the week of the 1969 Masters. His best finish in a major was a T-3 at the 1970 U.S. Open. Lunn retired from the PGA Tour in 1980 and took club pro and teaching pro jobs at three clubs in northern California. Currently he holds the position of Senior PGA Tour Professional at Woodbridge Golf and Country Club in Woodbridge, California.

Lunn has played in just over four dozen events on the Champions Tour since turning 50 in 1995. His best finish was T-34 at the 1995 Kaanapali Classic.

Amateur wins (1)
 1963 U.S. Amateur Public Links

Professional wins (9)

PGA Tour wins (6)

PGA Tour playoff record (2–0)

Other wins (3)
 1969 Southern California Open
 1984 Northern California PGA Matchplay Championship
 1986 Northern California PGA Strokeplay Championship

Results in major championships

Note: Lunn never played in The Open Championship.

CUT = missed the half-way cut
"T" indicates a tie for a place

See also
 1966 PGA Tour Qualifying School graduates

References

Further reading

External links
 

American male golfers
PGA Tour golfers
PGA Tour Champions golfers
Golfers from Sacramento, California
Golfers from San Francisco
1945 births
Living people